The women's 50 metre freestyle event at the 2008 Olympic Games took place on 15–17 August at the Beijing National Aquatics Center in Beijing, China.

Germany's Britta Steffen blasted a new Olympic record to strike a sprint freestyle double. She posted a time of 24.06, the second-fastest ever in the event, to erase Inge de Bruijn's 2000 record, and to hold off U.S. swimmer Dara Torres in a close race by a hundredth of a second (0.01). Returning from an eight-year absence, Torres became the first woman in Olympic history to swim past the age of 40. She established both a personal best and an American record of 24.07 to earn a silver medal and eleventh overall in her fifth Olympics since 1984. Meanwhile, Australian teenager Cate Campbell picked up a bronze in 24.17, edging out her teammate Lisbeth Trickett (24.25) by 0.08 of a second.

Netherlands' Marleen Veldhuis finished fifth with a time of 24.26, and was followed in the sixth spot by American Kara Lynn Joyce in 24.63. Veldhuis' teammate Hinkelien Schreuder (24.65) and Belarus' Aliaksandra Herasimenia (24.77) rounded out the finale.

Notable swimmers missed out the top 8 final, featuring Sweden's Therese Alshammar, four-time Olympian and silver medalist in Sydney eight years earlier, and Finland's Hanna-Maria Seppälä, fourth-place finalist in the 100 m freestyle.

Records
Prior to this competition, the existing world and Olympic records were as follows.

The following new world and Olympic records were set during this competition.

Results

Heats

Semifinals

Semifinal 1

Semifinal 2

Final

References

External links
Official Olympic Report

Women's freestyle 050 metre
2008 in women's swimming
Women's events at the 2008 Summer Olympics